David James Cathcart King  (1913 – 29 September 1989) was a British historian, archaeologist, and school-teacher. While working as a teacher he perused his research in his free time, becoming "one of the leading authorities on the medieval castle". King was also president of the Cambrian Archaeological Association. A festschrift dedicated to King was published in 1987, titled Castles in Wales and the Marches.

Education 
King went to school at Clifton College in Bristol and studied law at the University of Bristol. He was the first student to complete a Master of Laws at the University of Bristol.

Career 
During the Second World War, King served in the Royal Artillery in the Middle East. His time there encouraged his interest in military architecture, and he went on to write papers about Krak des Chevaliers and the Citadel of Damascus.

After the war, King worked at Walton Lodge Preparatory School in Bristol as a history teacher. He was elected as a Fellow of the Society of Antiquaries in 1962.

Selected publications

References

External links 
 Archival record from the Society of Antiquaries of London
 University of Bristol Special Collections Archival record from the University of Bristol Special Collections

British archaeologists
1913 births
1989 deaths
Alumni of the University of Bristol
Castellologists
British historians
British Army personnel of World War II
Royal Artillery personnel
Military personnel from Bristol